Vishveshwara, one of the names of Shiva, is also an Indian surname. Notable people with this name include:
C. V. Vishveshwara (1938–2017), Indian black hole physicist, married to Saraswathi, father of Smitha
Saraswathi Vishveshwara (born 1946), Indian biophysicist, married to C. V., mother of Smitha
Smitha Vishveshwara (born 1974), Indian quantum condensed matter physicist, daughter of C. V. and Saraswathi

See also
Gaga Bhatt, 17th century Brahmin scholar born as Vishveshvara Bhatta
Devanahalli Fort, near Bangalore, containing a temple formerly called Kashi Vishveshwara
Sri Vishweshwara Temple, Yellur